Guiqiao Road is a station that is part of Line 14 of the Shanghai Metro. Located at the intersection of Jinsui Road and Chuanqiao Road in Pudong, the station serves as the eastern terminus of the line and it opened with the rest of Line 14 on December 30, 2021. Previously, this station was given the name Jinsui Road.

References 

Railway stations in Shanghai
Shanghai Metro stations in Pudong
Line 14, Shanghai Metro
Railway stations in China opened in 2021